The 40th International Emmy Awards took place on November 19, 2012, in New York City, and hosted by Regis Philbin. The award ceremony, presented by the International Academy of Television Arts and Sciences (IATAS), honors all TV programming produced and originally aired outside the United States.

In addition to the presentation of the International Emmys for programming and performances, the International Academy presented two special awards. Ryan Murphy, Alan Alda and Norman Lear, received the Founders Award and Kim In-Kyu, president and CEO of Korean Broadcasting System, received the Directorate Award.

Ceremony 
Nominations for the 40th International Emmy Awards were announced on October 8, 2012, by the International Academy of Television Arts & Sciences (IATAS) at a Press Conference at Mipcom in Cannes. There are 38 nominees in 9 categories. Nominations span 15 countries: Argentina, Australia, Belgium, Brazil, China, Denmark, France, Germany, Japan, Norway, Portugal, Singapore, South Korea, Spain and the United Kingdom. This year's the International Emmy competitions have three rounds of judging over a period of 6 months, with participation from jurors across 67 countries.

In celebration of the International Emmys 40th anniversary, the International Academy paid tribute to Alan Alda and Norman Lear with Special Founders Awards. Also, the 2012 International Emmy Founders Award was presented to producer/writer Ryan Murphy, Co-creator & Executive Producer of Glee while the 2012 International Emmy Directorate Award was presented to Dr. Kim In-Kyu, President & CEO of KBS, also President of the ABU.

Broadcast
A special edition of the ceremony aired on December 9, 2012, by MGM Portugal.

Winners and nominees

References

External links 
 International Academy of Television Arts & Sciences Official website
 40TH INTERNATIONAL EMMY® AWARDS NOMINEES ANNOUNCED
 40TH INTERNATIONAL EMMY® AWARDS WINNERS ANNOUNCED 

International Emmy Awards ceremonies
2012 television awards
2012 in American television